Coronation Street is a British soap opera first broadcast on 9 December 1960. The following is a list of characters introduced in 2021, by order of first appearance. All characters are introduced by series producer Iain MacLeod. The first character to be introduced is Lucas Kempton (Glen Wallace) in January, as a love interest of Carla Connor (Alison King). Teenager Jacob Hay (Jack James Ryan) arrives in February, followed by Ronnie Bailey (Vinta Morgan), the brother of Ed (Trevor Michael Georges), later that month. In March, drug lord Harvey Gaskell (Will Mellor) made his first appearance. Stefan Brent (Paul Opacic) was introduced in April as the father of Corey Brent (Maximus Evans). Curtis Delamere (Sam Retford) then made his first appearance in May as a love interest for Emma Brooker (Alexandra Mardell). Mia (Madeline Edmondson) begins appearing in September as an inmate that befriends Kelly Neelan (Millie Gibson) in prison, as well as Leo Thompkins (Joe Frost), a construction worker hired by the Platt family. Rebecca Ryan then joined the cast in December as Lydia Chambers. Additionally, multiple other characters appear throughout the year.

Lucas Kempton

Lucas Kempton, played by Glen Wallace, first appeared on 29 January 2021. He is introduced as a friend of Carla Connor's (Alison King) whom she met whilst staying in Devon. He surprises Carla when she is waiting for a business client for the Underworld clothing factory, who turns out to be Lucas.

Wallace expressed his joy with the way that his character was introduced, noting that he enjoys that Lucas has an established relationship with Carla. He states that it is "not clear exactly what happened between them in the past", and Inside Soap write that Carla is "visibly uneasy" when she comes into contact with Lucas. On Carla's romantic history with Peter Barlow (Chris Gascoyne), Wallace explained that while the viewers know their backstory, "Lucas doesn’t – and he doesn’t care". He defends his character, explaining that Lucas is not "heartless", but due to being a businessman, he is "used to overcoming obstacles in his life", and refers to Peter as "another obstacle" to Lucas. He also hinted that his character has regrets, and that since he is "no longer willing to miss out on life's opportunities", this motivates him to pursue Carla. He adds that Lucas sees a future with her. Wallace voiced his wishes to stay on Coronation Street for a long tenure, joking that he would like for his character to have a pint of beer with Ken Barlow (William Roache) in the Rovers Return.

Jacob Hay

Jacob Hay, played by Jack James Ryan, first appeared on 1 February 2021. He is a colleague of Simon Barlow (Alex Bain), who he works with at a food delivery company. When Simon reveals to him that he is struggling for money, Jacob gives him £60. When Simon's friend Kelly Neelan (Millie Gibson) sees Jacob with Simon, she makes a comment about how he cannot be trusted. She later states that while at another school, he was in a relationship with her friend, and treated her badly. She then explains that he was also imprisoned for stabbing somebody over an incident involving drugs. Simon dismisses her comments, stating that people can change following their mistakes.

The character and Ryan's casting was announced on 29 January 2021. It was stated that Jacob would "shake things up" in Coronation Street, and it was confirmed that he is part of a gang that sell drugs disguised as food deliveries. On his casting, Ryan took to social media to state that he is "incredibly proud" to be able to appear on the soap, and stated that he found it difficult to keep his casting a secret. He explained that since he is from Manchester, he "can't quite articulate what it means" to be part of the cast of Coronation Street, and confirmed that he has watched the show since he was young, and always hoped to "step on those cobbles".

In scenes aired on 12 March 2021, it is revealed that Jacob has been secretly ripping drug lord Harvey Gaskell (Will Mellor) off. When Harvey discovers his betrayal, he orders a beating for Jacob, and he is put into hospital. Following the episode, actor Ryan confirmed that the scenes were his last. He thanked the fans of the soap for welcoming him, and added that his time on Coronation Street was "an absolute dream come true" for him. However, Jacob returns in 2022 after series producer Iain MacLeod decided to bring him back to the soap. He explained his decision, stating that Ryan is a good actor and that the character "feels very Coronation Street and he's got funny bones. He's got a really good way with the comedy and feels very authentic as well." His return storyline sees him revealed as the boyfriend of Amy Barlow (Elle Mulvaney); the producers formed the relationship as they liked the idea of pairing a bad boy up with "somebody who is historically quite well behaved and wouldn't say boo to a goose". MacLeod added that the relationship will also explore Jacob's redemption as it explains how he ended up in the drugs industry. He felt that while Jacob has done some bad things, he is mature enough to know he needs to make amends in the town. He hoped that the scenes would "reframe people's view of him and make you see him in a slightly different light".

Ronnie Bailey

Ronnie Bailey, played by Vinta Morgan, made his first appearance on 19 February 2021. The character and casting details were announced in January 2021, when details of a storyline regarding the Bailey family undergoing systematic racism was also announced. Ronnie is introduced as the brother of established character Ed (Trevor Michael Georges). It was stated that upon his arrival, he will be "a massive injection of chaos, energy and humour". Ronnie was described as a "real jack the lad", and it was stated that he "will tip [the Bailey family's] currently-quite-cosy lifestyle on its head", and that "he'll be setting many cats among many pigeons up and down the street, much to Ed's exasperation at times". Executive producer Iain MacLeod added that Ronnie "will arrive off the back of quite a big family drama and he turns up with a secret". His backstory was later confirmed; Ronnie is a 51-year-old single man from London who looks to relocate to Weatherfield for unknown reasons. He is described as "the wayward uncle who can be slightly ruthless but irrepressibly charming", and it was noted that he is good with business decisions and money. It was also hinted that he would look for romance in Weatherfield.

MacLeod teased that Ronnie arrives at "the worst possible time", since he arrives in Weatherfield at the same time that Grace Vickers (Kate Spencer) goes into labour prematurely. He compared his arrival to "holding the hand grenade with the pin already out and just wondering when to drop it", but added that he "means no malice" by his actions. MacLeod also compared Ronnie's personality to former character Danny Baldwin (Bradley Walsh), noting that like Danny, Ronnie is "slightly ruthless but also irrepressibly charming", and that Coronation Street has not had a character like Ronnie "for a while". Morgan's portrayal of Ronnie was not initially announced. Without giving any details on the portrayer, MacLeod stated that the actor is "fabulous" and "really, really strong". When his casting was announced, Morgan stated: "It's so great to be joining Coronation Street. I grew up watching it, I know the characters, I've lived the stories and now, to play my part on the street, I can only say I'm blessed. In my household it has always been a firm favourite", and added that Ronnie is an "enigmatic character".

Ronnie's estranged wife Kat Bailey (Melissa Bailey) arrives in Weatherfield, due to him ignoring her phone calls. He explains that he wants to stay in Weatherfield since he needs to know if Michael (Ryan Russell) is his son or his nephew. Morgan explained that after Ronnie keeping the secret for over three decades, it is the actions of Kat that motivate him to find out the truth. He explains that prior to Aggie (Lorna Laidlaw) meeting Ed, she had a relationship with Ronnie, and the timeline of Michael's birth means that Ronnie could be Ronnie's father. Morgan states that due to being 50 and having no children, Ronnie is "yearning for fatherhood", and that if Michael is his son, it "would mean everything to him". He also hinted that if this were the case, Ronnie would not have an issue with telling Ed, since he is "slightly arrogant".

Harvey Gaskell

Harvey Gaskell, played by Will Mellor, made his first appearance on 12 March 2021. Harvey is the drug lord boss of Simon Barlow (Alex Bain) and Jacob Hay (Jack James Ryan). The character and Mellor's casting was announced on 9 February 2021, where it was stated that his character will "pile on the pressure" for Simon, and that when Simon and adoptive mother Leanne Battersby (Jane Danson) tries to free himself from the drug business, Harvey "no intention of letting them out of his grasp". On joining the soap, he commented: "I'm honoured to be asked to come into Coronation Street, it's such an iconic show and has been a huge part of my family life". He recalled that when he began acting, it was his mother's dream for him to join the soap, so he was happy to "finally be able to make it come true". He described the soap as a "Manchester institution", and that he was pleased to have finally appeared in the series. Talking about the character, Mellor stated that Harvey is the first "out-and-out baddie" he has played in his career, which made him excited to portray the role, adding that Harvey will "make some waves" in Weatherfield.

Executive producer Iain MacLeod expressed his excitement at Mellor's casting, and noted that he has "thrown himself heart and soul into making his character as terrifyingly real as possible". He confirmed that Harvey would have a large impact on the characters involved in the drug dealing storyline "from the moment he swaggers menacingly onto the screen". Mellor described Harvey as a "seasoned baddie who turns vulnerable people into drug dealers and bullies them into doing things they don't want to". He added that when Harvey threatens to break somebody's legs, "he means it". Mellor stated that he was "apprehensive" to join Coronation Street as a villain, and believes he will be confronted on the street by fans of the soap. Mellor explained that despite the soap being fictional, "die-hard fans feel everything for these characters" which led him to fear he would get a negative response from viewers. Prior to his first appearance airing, Mellor was already receiving messages from fans of the soap telling him to "leave Simon and Leanne alone", so he anticipated even more messages following his scenes airing.

After a trial, Harvey is found guilty of drug offences after Sharon betrayed him by providing evidence only to take his position as a drug lord. It was stated that Mellor had left the soap following Harvey's sentencing; however, in August 2021, Mellor was spotted filming for the soap again. It was then confirmed that he would be returning to Coronation Street. Harvey escapes from prison to get revenge on Leanne for sending him to prison and accidentally shoots Natasha Blakeman (Rachel Leskovac) in a case of mistaken identity as she is wearing the same Hallowen costume as Leanne. Natasha dies in hospital from her injuries and Harvey goes back to prison after Leanne crashes the car into a skip and knocks Harvey unconscious.

Stefan Brent
Stefan Brent, played by Paul Opacic, made his first appearance on 26 April 2021. Stefan was the "rich businessman father" of established character Corey Brent (Maximus Evans). Louise McCreesh stated that his introduction will see him spar with Dev Alahan (Jimmi Harkishin) over the rekindling of Corey's relationship with Dev's daughter Asha Alahan (Tanisha Gorey). McCreesh also hinted that the situation could lead to a "violent head between the warring dads". Tamara Davidson of the Daily Mirror wrote that Stefan would be the next villain on Coronation Street, and that he would "take part in a major new storyline and cause chaos on the street". Due to Stefan's son Corey being disliked by viewers, Davidson wrote "wait to see what kind of monster created him". Stefan Brent used his wealth to cover up the murder committed by his son Corey and help to clear his name in court during the trial of Kelly Neelan. Eventually, evidence of Corey's murder would be collected, and this revelation was made to both Stefan and Corey whilst they were attempting to flee the area, instead being taken hostage by Gary Windass and delivered to the police station.

Curtis Delamere

Curtis Delamere, played by Sam Retford, made his first appearance on 24 May 2021. Curtis was introduced as a love interest for Emma Brooker (Alexandra Mardell) when the pair meet while she is working a shift in the Rovers Return Inn. Susannah Alexander, writing for Digital Spy, stated that he will bring "some excitement and potentially romance" to Emma's life. Calli Kitson of the Metro described Curtis as a "good-looking young man" who offers to help Emma move barrels of alcohol into the pub's cellar. The pair share a drink, but Emma's father Steve McDonald (Simon Gregson) is unhappy to find them as he deems Curtis a "hooligan" since he knocked Steve from his bike in a charity bike race. Curtis knocking Steve from his bike led him to come last in the race, so he initially holds a grudge against Curtis.

Steve tries to make amends with Curtis by giving him pointers for his forthcoming interview at the Bistro. Steve and Emma help Curtis by giving him a mock interview, where he informs them that he is also training to become a doctor, which causes Emma to "swoon" and leaves Steve "impressed". He gets the job and thanks the pair for their help. Kate White of Inside Soap wrote that "sparks fly" between Curtis and Emma, and stated that there is "potential for romance" between the pair. White also confirmed that since Curtis had gotten the job at the Bistro, Emma and her family would be seeing "a lot more of Curtis", and pondered if the new relationship could be the "start of something special".

Retford was driving along the M60 motorway with his car strapped full of school lockers when his manager called him. They explained to the actor that the producers wanted him to portray Curtis, which left him feeling "very happy" for the rest of the journey. Retford described his character as determined, hardworking, nice and curious. He said that he has never played a character like Curtis before, who Retford finds to be nervous and has "a lot to learn, and a lot to offer". The actor liked that his character is different to previous roles, since he enjoyed playing a character who is happy and is enjoying life. On Curtis' budding relationship with Emma, Retford explained that his character sees a fresh start in her, which excites him.

Curtis and Emma's relationship bloomed into a marriage proposal under the pretense that Curtis was terminally ill. However, Curtis' infliction was in fact factitious disorder, meaning that as a result of his mental illness, he was lying to Emma about him dying, when there was in fact no threat to his physical health. Although Emma initially agreed to still marry Curtis and forgive him for his lies under the condition that he was honest with everyone moving forwards, the couple split once Emma saw Curtis telling hospital staff that he was dying, and the two would not be legally wed, leading to Curtis' departure from the show.

Leo Thompkins

Leo Thompkins, played by Joe Frost, made his first appearance on 27 September 2021. Leo is introduced as a construction worker who is employed to perform structural work on the Platt family's garden. His storylines then see him "quickly become wrapped up in what's happening on the street and [meeting] more people". Frost described his character as a "salt of the earth bloke" who is hardworking and cares about the people around him. Frost did not know much about the character prior to securing the role, but had an interest in enriching his backstory and how he deals with people. Frost had watched Coronation Street for years prior to being cast and noted that his family are big fans of the soap; he felt that "the stars aligned" when he was cast as Leo. Frost found his first scene to be overwhelming, which he accredited to working with Helen Worth and Jack P. Shepherd. He was also grateful to Sally Ann Matthews and Charlotte Jordan for taking him "under their wing and giving Frost a "brilliant crash course in Corrie".

Jenny Connor (Matthews) introduces Leo to her stepdaughter Daisy Midgeley (Jordan) as a potential date, but Leo takes an interest in Jenny instead. He overhears Jenny state that she does not want to pursue more relationships, which leaves Leo feeling gutted, but Frost stated that his character is a "no-nonsense guy" who knows what he wants. Frost explained that Leo is interested in Jenny due to her outgoing personality, which he felt goes well with Leo's simple and grounded personality. He added that they would be a good match due to Leo being able to be there for Jenny.

On 26 September 2022 Leo was killed by Stephen Reid after confronting him about his attempt to scam his mother Audrey Roberts. After the two shove each other on top of the balcony of Underworld, Leo's mobile phone falls on the ground and as he attempts to retrieve it Stephen slams Leo's head into the railings, stunning him and pushes him off the balcony into a wheelie bin. After concealing the body from Sarah,  Carla and, later, the police, Stephen puts Leo's corpse into the back of a van. He then steals Leo's luggage and passport from the Rovers, leading Jenny to  believe he had gone to Canada without her. Later Stephen burns Leo's passport on wasteland.

Lydia Chambers

Lydia Chambers, played by Rebecca Ryan, made her first appearance on 10 December 2021. Lydia was introduced as a new personal assistant at Underworld factory. She attends a meeting with Sarah Platt (Tina O'Brien) and later befriends Sarah, who is horrified to realise that she has history with Sarah's husband Adam Barlow (Sam Robertson), whom she dated at university. A jealous Lydia eventually starts to harass the couple by breaking into their apartment and leaving gifts and threatening notes, but she is not suspected after Adam believes that it is a man who lost against his legal team in court. After weeks of sending herself text messages pretending to be Adam and making purchases on a forged credit card belonging to Adam, she tells Sarah that they had been having an affair. Sarah believes Lydia and kicks Adam out of their flat. When Adam tries to find out why she is doing this to him, she explains that she is getting revenge on him for treating her badly during their fling years prior to this. She also trashes her own flat whilst Adam is in the building which leads police to think that this was his doing. Adam is then arrested. In March, Adam and Lydia come to blows in a shopping centre. This leads to Lydia pushing Adam off the balcony, leaving Adam with potentially life-threatening injuries, including possible damage to his sight. Fortunately, Adam recovers safely and when Lydia is arrested, he lies and tells the police he fell, because he felt that it was payback for how he treated Lydia during their relationship. Lydia calls a truce with Adam before she leaves Weatherfield.

When Lydia begins to show her sinister side, viewers predicted that she would be similar to Emmerdale character Meena Jutla (Paige Sandhu), a serial killer. They felt that due to her "controlling" behaviour, her arc would follow the same route of Meena's, with her turning to murder. The Daily Mirror described Lydia as a bunny boiler and hinted that Sarah would become "the centre of a sinister plot, unable to know who to trust" due to Lydia's scheming. As Lydia's scheming increased, Ryan said that she was expecting a backlash from fans. She said that the negative fan reaction to a character is always scary for her, but appreciated the viewers enjoying the drama and taking the storyline seriously. Despite the backlash, Ryan felt that Lydia has a justified reason for her treatment of Adam, which she said viewers would hopefully understand too. She admitted that Lydia does go too far to get her point across, but felt that Lydia is not a bad person and does not want to "ruin lives for the sake of it". She added: "She's doing it because she has genuinely been broken and is potentially trying to save someone from going through what she went through."

Ryan was correct in her predictions as she noted that viewers of Coronation Street had shown a negative reaction to Lydia. She appeared on the ITV talk show Lorraine, where she joked that she is "quite hated at the minute" but said that she was taking the hatred as a compliment to her acting. She confirmed that Lydia would be exiting from the soap following the conclusion of her storyline with Adam and Sarah, but opined that Lydia could be redeemed. She explained: "hopefully people will start to see that and have a bit of sympathy for her and start to realise she's not a bad person at all, she's actually a nice person but has been hurt very badly. Hopefully, that will come across."

Other characters

References

External links
 Cast and characters at itv.com
 Cast and characters at the Internet Movie Database

2021 in British television
2021
, Coronation Street